Džemaludin Mušović (born 30 October 1944) is a Bosnian retired football manager and player. He is regarded as one of the most successful Bosnian football managers.

Club career
Mušović joined Hajduk Split from Sarajevo in 1966 for 13 million dinar after being persuaded by national teammate Vinko Cuzzi to come over to Dalmatia. He immediately won the 1967 Yugoslav Cup with them, beating his former club.

International career
Mušović made his debut for Yugoslavia in a September 1965 World Cup qualification match away against Luxembourg and has earned a total of 10 caps, scoring 2 goals. His final international was an April 1968 European Championship qualification match against France.

Managerial statistics

Honours

Player
Hajduk Split
Yugoslav Cup: 1966–67

Manager
Al-Arabi
Qatar Stars League: 1996–97
Qatar Crown Prince Cup: 1997

Qatar SC
Qatar Stars League: 2002–03
Qatar Crown Prince Cup: 2004

Qatar
Asian Games: 2006

References

External links

 Profile

1944 births
Living people
Footballers from Sarajevo
Association football forwards
Bosnia and Herzegovina footballers
Yugoslav footballers
Yugoslavia international footballers
FK Sarajevo players
HNK Hajduk Split players
Standard Liège players
LB Châteauroux players
Valenciennes FC players
Yugoslav First League players
Belgian Pro League players
Ligue 2 players
Ligue 1 players
Yugoslav expatriate footballers
Expatriate footballers in France
Yugoslav expatriate sportspeople in France
Expatriate footballers in Belgium
Yugoslav expatriate sportspeople in Belgium
Yugoslav football managers
NK Čelik Zenica managers
FK Sarajevo managers
Bosnia and Herzegovina football managers
Al Sadd SC managers
Al-Arabi SC (Qatar) managers
Al Jazira Club managers
Bosnia and Herzegovina national football team managers
Qatar SC managers
Qatar national football team managers
2007 AFC Asian Cup managers
Yugoslav First League managers
Bosnia and Herzegovina expatriate football managers
Expatriate football managers in Qatar
Bosnia and Herzegovina expatriate sportspeople in Qatar
Expatriate football managers in the United Arab Emirates
Bosnia and Herzegovina expatriate sportspeople in the United Arab Emirates